Forge Pond is a  pond in the Chiltonville section of Plymouth, Massachusetts, within the Eel River watershed. The pond's inflow and outflow is Shingle Brook, a tributary of the Eel River.

External links
Environmental Protection Agency
South Shore Coastal Watersheds - Lake Assessments

Ponds of Plymouth, Massachusetts
Ponds of Massachusetts